The Parkinson's Foundation is a national organization that funds research and provides educational resources to Parkinson’s disease patients and caregivers. The Parkinson's Foundation was established in 2016 through the merger of the National Parkinson Foundation and the Parkinson's Disease Foundation. The Parkinson's Foundation has headquarters in Miami and New York City, in addition to 17 chapters throughout the United States.

History

1957–1960s 
The organizations that merged to create the Parkinson's Foundation in 2016 were both created in 1957. The National Parkinson Foundation was founded by Jeanne C. Levey in Miami and the Parkinson's Disease Foundation was founded by William Black in New York.

The founding organizations funded researchers such as Melvin Yahr and H. Houston Merritt.

In 1965, Parkinson's Foundation funding led to the establishment of the Columbia University Medical Center‘s basic science laboratories in the William Black Building.

In 1969, Yahr and Parkinson's Foundation colleagues published results of the first double-blind trial of levodopa.

1970s–1980s 
The Parkinson's Foundation began funding summer fellowships for medical students in the 1970s.

In 1971, Roger C. Duvoisin developed the Columbia University Rating Scale, the forerunner to the Unified Parkinson Disease Rating Scale. In the same year, the Parkinson's Foundation and Merck, Inc. funded Dr. Yahr's double-blind clinical trial of carbidopa/levodopa (Sinemet®), which remains the gold standard therapy for Parkinson's disease.

In the 1980s, the Parkinson's Foundation began investing in movement disorder training fellowships at Columbia University and Rush University.

In 1985, the Parkinson's Foundation established its Centers of Excellence Network, which today consists of 51 designated medical centers worldwide that deliver care to more than 196,000 Parkinson's patients.

1990s–2000s 
With funding from the Parkinson's Foundation, Duvoisin and his team described the Contursi kindred – the first description of inherited Parkinson's – in 1990.

In 1994, the Parkinson's Foundation joined several other organizations to create a scientific research fundraiser, the Parkinson's Unity Walk.

In 2002, a research team at Columbia University funded by the Parkinson's Foundation found evidence that Parkinson's requires the alpha-synuclein protein, a now well-known hallmark of the disease.

2010s–2020s 
In 2011, the Parkinson's Foundation launched Moving Day®, its signature fundraising walk for Parkinson's.

In 2019, the Parkinson's Foundation launched PD GENEration, a national initiative that offers genetic testing for clinically relevant Parkinson's-related genes and genetic counseling at no cost for Parkinson's patients.

In 2022, the Parkinson's Foundation partnered with Parkinson's UK to establish the Venture Philanthropy Fund, which invests money into Parkinson's disease research.

Research

Clinical Studies

Parkinson's Outcomes Project 
The Parkinson's Outcomes Project was started in 2009 and as of 2022 remains the largest-ever clinical study of Parkinson's disease. The longitudinal study is executed through the Parkinson's Foundation Global Care Network and monitors the symptoms and quality of life of Parkinson's patients to determine best practices in healthcare and establish standard treatment protocols.

The Parkinson's Outcomes Project found that depression and anxiety are the number one factors impacting the overall health of Parkinson's patients. The study also found that increasing physical activity to at least 2.5 hours a week can slow decline in quality of life.

PD GENEration: Mapping the Future of Parkinson's Disease 
PD GENEration: Mapping the Future of Parkinson's Disease is a national initiative that offers genetic testing for clinically relevant Parkinson's-related genes and genetic counseling at no cost for Parkinson's patients.

Venture Philanthropy Fund 
In 2022, the Parkinson's Foundation established the Venture Philanthropy Fund. This fund advances Parkinson's disease research by investing money into the Parkinson's Virtual Biotech Fund, the drug development arm of Parkinson's UK.

Affiliations

Global Care Network 
The Parkinson's Foundation Global Care Network is a healthcare network that provides care to Parkinson's patients. The network is composed of Centers of Excellence and Comprehensive Care Centers.

A Parkinson's Foundation Center of Excellence is a medical center with a specialized team of neurologists, movement disorder specialists, physical therapists, occupational therapists, mental health professionals and others who are up to date on the latest Parkinson's medications, therapies and research. The Foundation has designated 60 medical centers around the world as part of its Global Care Network.

Parkinson's Foundation Comprehensive Care Centers are medical facilities with multi-disciplinary teams providing Parkinson's care. Each center is required to meet care, professional training, community education and outreach criteria.

The Parkinson's Foundation is affiliated with the following institutions:

Research Centers 
The Parkinson's Foundation has designated four institutions as research centers: Columbia University Medical Center, the University of Florida in collaboration with Emory University, the University of Michigan in collaboration with The University of Texas Southwestern Medical Center, and the Yale School of Medicine. These institutions receive $2 million in Parkinson's Foundation funding over four years to further research that advances the understanding and treatment of Parkinson's.

Grants and Awards 
Since 1957, the Parkinson's Foundation has invested more than $425 million in Parkinson's disease research and clinical care.

Awards for Institutions 
The Parkinson's Foundation Research Center designation provides funding for team science at institutions working on a thematic area of Parkinson's disease.

The Institutional Movement Disorders Fellowship provides an institution with the funds to support the two-year long training of an incoming movement disorders fellow.

Awards for Independent Investigators 
George G. Kaufman Impact Awards fund projects that are in need of support to impact the Parkinson's community.

Stanley Fahn Junior Faculty Awards provide funding to early career scientists to further their Parkinson's disease research.

Conference Awards support the gathering of experts working to address unsolved clinical or basic science problems relevant to Parkinson's disease.

Fellowships & Early Career Awards 
The Launch Award is an award for postdoctoral researchers who are transitioning to independent research careers in Parkinson's.

Postdoctoral Fellowships are two-year fellowships for scientists who have recently completed their Ph.D. training or neurology residencies.

Visiting Scholar Awards support the travel and housing of scholars while visiting host laboratories that conduct Parkinson's research.

Summer Student Fellowships provide students interested in Parkinson's disease with an opportunity to conduct research through 10 weeks of clinical or laboratory work.

The Melvin Yahr Early Career Award in Movement Disorders Research supports neurologists after residency.

Partnership Awards are collaborative partnerships supporting clinician-scientist training, patient-oriented Parkinson's research and medical student Parkinson's studies.

The Nurse Faculty Award is seed grant funding intended to support Edmond J. Safra Visiting Nurse Scholars.

The Physical Therapy Faculty Award is seed grant funding intended to support Physical Therapy Faculty alumni.

Advocacy 
The Parkinson's Foundation partners with The Michael J. Fox Foundation to host the Parkinson's Policy Forum. The event brings together community members and researchers for research updates, policy briefings, advocacy trainings and networking opportunities.

The People with Parkinson's Advisory Council is a patient leadership group. The council was created in 2006 and is composed of people with Parkinson's disease and caregivers who serve as advisors to the foundation.

The Parkinson's Foundation Research Advocates program trains Parkinson's patients and their caregivers to collaborate with Parkinson's disease scientists in research. The program was established in 2008 and has trained more than 350 participants.

Programs and Services

Helpline 
The Parkinson's Foundation Helpline is staffed by nurses, social workers and health educators. PD Conversations is an online support network that allows individuals to ask experts Parkinson's questions.

Newly Diagnosed 
The Newly Diagnosed Kit includes information and resources for individuals who have recently been diagnosed with Parkinson's disease.

Aware in Care 
The Aware in Care hospitalization kit provides information and resources to help Parkinson's patients stay safe during hospital visits.

Virtual Education Programming

Care Partner Program 
The series of online courses provides Parkinson's caregivers with information and tools to help care for someone living with Parkinson's disease.

Expert Briefings Webinars 
The webinars highlight the latest Parkinson's disease research and updates from experts in the field.

PD Health @ Home 
The virtual educational and wellness program hosts weekly online events that provide at-home resources to Parkinson's patients and caregivers. Events include Mindfulness Mondays, Wellness Wednesdays and Fitness Fridays.

Substantial Matters: Life and Science of Parkinson's 
The podcast series, hosted by Dan Keller, PhD, interviews Parkinson's experts to highlight treatments and techniques for living with Parkinson's disease, as well as research updates in the field.

Community Grant Program 
The grants support education and outreach programs that address unmet needs in the Parkinson's community. Since 2011, the Parkinson's Foundation has invested more than $9.4 million in community-based programs.

Community events

Moving Day 
Moving Day, a Walk for Parkinson's, is the main fundraising event for the Parkinson's Foundation. Moving Day was started in 2011 and hosts events in cities across the United States. The walk has raised over $40 million to advance Parkinson's disease research and improve care.

Parkinson's Champions 
Parkinson's Champions is a community fundraising and endurance program. Individuals plan their own events or participate in endurance races to raise funds and awareness for Parkinson's disease. The program has raised nearly $12 million.

Parkinson's Revolution 
Revolution is an annual indoor cycling event that raises funds to generate awareness and advance the mission of the Parkinson's Foundation. Revolution was started in 2020 and events take place in cities across the United States. The cycling event has raised over $565,000 to advance Parkinson's disease research and improve care.

Key people 
John L. Lehr has been the chief executive officer since 2017. J. Gordon Beckham, Jr. serves as the chair of the Foundation's board of directors.

Mergers, acquisitions, and partnerships 
In August 2016, PDF and NPF merged to form the Parkinson's Foundation.

In October 2017, the Parkinson's Foundation acquired the Melvin Yahr International Parkinson's Disease Foundation.

In January 2020, the Parkinson's Foundation partnered with Zelira Therapeutics to study the benefits of medical cannabis in PD patients.

In May 2020, the Parkinson's Foundation partnered with the U.S. Department of Veteran Affairs to increase access to information about Parkinson's disease. Veterans who develop Parkinson's disease can be associated with exposure to Agent Orange or other herbicides during military service.

References 

Parkinson's disease
Medical and health foundations in the United States
Neurology organizations
Disability organizations based in the United States